Kathy Hall (née Simeonoff) (born  in New Zealand) is a former association football player who represented New Zealand at international level.

Hall made her Football Ferns debut in their first ever international as they beat Hong Kong 2–0 on 25 August 1975 at the inaugural AFC Women's Asian Cup. She finished her international career with 16 caps and 3 goal to her credit.

Honours

New Zealand
AFC Women's Championship: 1975

References

1956 births
Living people
New Zealand women's international footballers
New Zealand women's association footballers

Women's association footballers not categorized by position